Beti Bachao, Beti Padhao ( Save the Daughter, Educate the Daughter) is a campaign launched by the Government of India. It mainly targets the clusters in Uttar Pradesh, Haryana, Uttarakhand, Punjab, Bihar and Delhi.

Background
The child sex ratio in India had been going down at an alarming rate. In the population census of 2011, the child sex ratio in India was 919 females of girls aged 0 to 6 years old.
During the 2014 International Day of the Girl Child, Prime Minister Narendra Modi asked the public to help end sexism against girls in India.

The Beti Bachao, Beti Padhao (BBBP) scheme was launched on 22 January 2015 by Prime Minister Narendra Modi. It aims to address the issue of the declining child sex ratio image (CSR) and is a national initiative jointly run by the Ministry of Women and Child Development, the Ministry of Health and Family Welfare and the Ministry of Education. It initially focused on multi-sector action in 100 districts throughout the country where there was a low CSR

On 26 August 2016, Olympics 2016 bronze medallist Sakshi Malik was made the brand ambassador for BBBP.

The hashtag #SelfieWithDaughter was promoted on social media in June 2015, which started when Sunil Jaglan the Sarpanch of the village Bibipur, Jind in Haryana took a selfie with his daughter Nandini  and posted on Facebook on 9 June 2015. The hashtag garnered worldwide fame.

Reasons for this initiative

Sex-selective abortion or female foeticide has led to a sharp drop in the ratio of girls born in contrast to boy infants in some states in India. Ultrasound technology has made it possible for pregnant women and their families to learn the sex of a foetus early in a pregnancy. Discrimination against girl infants, for several reasons, has combined with the technology to result in a rise in abortions of foetuses identified as female during ultrasonic testing.

The trend was first noticed when results of the 1991 national census were released and were confirmed to be a worsening problem when results of the 2001 national census were released. The reduction in the female population of certain Indian states continues to worsen, as results of the 2011 national census have shown. It has been observed that the trend is most pronounced in relatively prosperous regions of India. The dowry system in India is often blamed; the expectation that a large dowry must be provided for daughters for them to marry is frequently cited as a major cause for the problem.  Pressure for parents to provide large dowries for their daughters is most intense in prosperous states where high standards of living, and modern consumerism, are more prevalent in Indian society.

Rates of female foeticide in Madhya Pradesh are increasing; the rate of live births was 932 girls per 1000 boys in 2001, which dropped to 918 by 2011. It is expected that if this trend continues, by 2021 the number of girls will drop below 900 per 1000 boys.

Support
The Govt of India has formed a National Executive Committee to promote Beti Bachao Beti Padhao (BBBP) across the country. The committee is organizing several programs to promote "Save Girl Child" and "to Educate Girl Child" since January 2015.  Dr. Rajendra Phadke is the National Convener of BBBP Abhiyan. 

The Beti Bachao campaign is also supported by the Indian Medical Association.

Effectiveness
The Comptroller and Auditor General of India (CAG) reported that the scheme failed to meet its objectives. As per the CAG data, the sex ratio has deteriorated in many districts of Haryana and Punjab. According to the report of the Parliamentary Standing Committee on Human Resource Development, only ₹5 crores of a total of ₹43 crores allotted for the scheme in the financial year 2016-2017 was properly used.

As per the government data, more than 56% of funds were spent on publicity from 2014-15 to 2018-19. Less than 25% of the funds were released to districts and states, and the government did not release more than 19 percent of the funds. Minister of state Ministry of Women and Child Development, Virendra Kumar Khatik, claimed that the sex ratio in 53 out of 161 districts under the scheme declined between 2014–15 and 2016-17. According to experts, the scheme's minimal success is due to the government's inability to release funds efficiently and its disproportionate focus on publicity rather than making initiatives in the health and education sectors.

In 2021, in Lok Sabha, according to the Parliamentary committee on the Empowerment of Women,  78.91% funds for 'Beti Bachao Beti Padhao' were spent on ads.

References

Government schemes in India
Sex selection in India
Modi administration initiatives
Women's education in India
Women's rights in India
Articles created or expanded during Women's History Month (India) - 2015
2015 establishments in India